Fromenteau (sometimes called Beurot) is the name for several grape varieties, most importantly the medieval name for a Burgundian variety which had pale red berries and white juice, and is probably the ancestor of Pinot gris. 

It is also used as a synonym for the several grapes

Roussanne of the Rhône

Other usages
Fromenteau Gris is furthermore a synonym of Pinot Gris
Fromenteau Rouge a synonym of Savagnin Rose and possibly Gewürztraminer